The Mexin Doors 2001 Chinese FA Cup (Chinese: 2001年美心门中国足球协会杯) was the 7th edition of Chinese FA Cup. The matches of the first round were kicked off on 29 April 2001. The cup title sponsor was Mexin Doors, which was the second title sponsor of the Chinese FA Cup.

Results

First round

Second round

Third round

First leg

Second leg

Semi-finals

First leg

Second leg

Finals

First leg

Second leg

References

2001
2001 in Chinese football
2001 domestic association football cups